St. Alban's Parish is an Episcopal Church in Washington, D.C. and is a member of the Episcopal Diocese of Washington. It was founded by Phoebe Pemberton Morris Nourse, who bequeathed $35 to establish the church.

History
Construction of the church began in 1851 on Mount Alban in Washington, D.C. and opened on April 20, 1854. The church established several missions in the area over the next half century including St. Columba's and St. George's in 1875, St. David's in 1901, and All Souls and St. Patrick's in 1911.

References

Episcopal churches in Washington, D.C.
Churches completed in 1854
19th-century Episcopal church buildings
1854 establishments in Washington, D.C.
Religious organizations established in 1854